The Lod Airport massacre was a terrorist attack that occurred on 30 May 1972. Three members of the Japanese Red Army recruited by the Popular Front for the Liberation of Palestine – External Operations (PFLP-EO), attacked Lod Airport (now Ben Gurion International Airport) near Tel Aviv, killing 26 people and injuring 80 others. Two of the attackers were killed, while a third, Kōzō Okamoto, was captured after being wounded.

The dead comprised 17 Christian pilgrims from Puerto Rico, a Canadian citizen, and eight Israelis, including Professor Aharon Katzir, an internationally renowned protein biophysicist. Katzir was head of the Israeli National Academy of Sciences, a popular scientific radio show host, and a candidate in the upcoming Israeli presidential election. His brother, Ephraim Katzir, was elected President of Israel the following year.

Because airport security was focused on the possibility of a Palestinian attack, the use of Japanese attackers took the guards by surprise. The attack has often been described as a suicide mission, but it has also been asserted that it was the outcome of an unpublicized larger operation that went awry. The three perpetrators—Kōzō Okamoto, Tsuyoshi Okudaira, and Yasuyuki Yasuda—had been trained in Baalbek, Lebanon; the actual planning was handled by Wadie Haddad (a.k.a. Abu Hani), head of PFLP External Operations, with some input from Okamoto. In the immediate aftermath, Der Spiegel speculated that funding had been provided by some of the $5 million ransom paid by the West German government in exchange for the hostages of hijacked Lufthansa Flight 649 in February 1972.

Attack
At 10 p.m. the attackers arrived at the airport aboard an Air France flight from Rome. Dressed conservatively and carrying slim violin cases, they attracted little attention. As they entered the waiting area, they opened up their violin cases and extracted Czech vz. 58 assault rifles with the butt stocks removed. They began to fire indiscriminately at airport staff and visitors, which included a group of pilgrims from Puerto Rico, and tossed grenades as they changed magazines. Yasuda was accidentally shot dead by one of the other attackers, and Okudaira moved from the airport building into the landing area, firing at passengers disembarking from an El Al aircraft before being killed by one of his own grenades, either due to accidental premature explosion or as a suicide. Okamoto was shot by security, brought to the ground by an El Al employee, and arrested as he attempted to leave the terminal. Whether the attackers were responsible for killing all of the victims has been disputed, as some victims may have been caught in the crossfire of the attackers and airport security.

Fatalities

A total of 26 people were killed during the attack:

US citizens from Puerto Rico

Reverend Angel Berganzo
Carmelo Calderón Molina
Carmela Cintrón
Carmen E. Crespo
Vírgen Flores
Esther González
Blanca González de Pérez
Carmen Guzmán
Eugenia López
Enrique Martínez Rivera
Vasthy Zila Morales de Vega
José M. Otero Adorno
Antonio Pacheco
Juan Padilla
Antonio Rodríguez Morales
Consorcia Rodríguez
José A. Rodríguez

Israeli citizens

Yoshua Berkowitz
Zvi Gutman
Aharon Katzir
Orania Luba
Aviva Oslander
Henia Ratner
Shprinza Ringel
Adam Tzamir

Canadian citizen
Luna Sabbah

Aftermath
The Japanese public initially reacted with disbelief to initial reports that the perpetrators of the massacre were Japanese until a Japanese embassy official sent to the hospital confirmed that Okamoto was a Japanese national. Okamoto told the diplomat that he had nothing personal against the Israeli people, but that he had to do what he did because "It was my duty as a soldier of the revolution." Okamoto was tried by an Israeli military tribunal and sentenced to life imprisonment in June 1972. During his trial, he actively undermined his own defense, and in particular protested his lawyer's requests for a psychiatric evaluation, but managed to avoid the death penalty by pleading guilty. Okamoto served only 13 years of his prison sentence. He was released in 1985 with more than 1,000 other prisoners in an exchange for captured Israeli soldiers. He settled in Lebanon's Bekaa Valley. He was arrested in 1997 for passport forgery and visa violations, but in 2000 was granted political refugee status in Lebanon. He is still wanted by the Japanese government . Four other JRA members arrested at the same time were extradited to Japan.

In response to the attack, the PFLP's spokesman, Ghassan Kanafani, was assassinated by the Mossad a few weeks later. Mossad agents planted a bomb in his car that detonated after he turned on the ignition. Kanafani's 17 year old niece was also killed.

Various pieces of media output have claimed the primary organizer of the attack Wadie Haddad, was assassinated by Mossad although official records state he died of leukemia.

Lod Massacre Remembrance Day
In June 2006 a legislative initiative (Senate Project (PS) 1535) by José Garriga Picó, a then senator of Puerto Rico was approved by unanimous vote of both houses of the Legislative Assembly of Puerto Rico, making every 30 May 'Lod Massacre Remembrance Day'. The initiative was signed into law on 2 August 2006 by Governor Aníbal Acevedo Vilá, making 30 May 2007, the 35th anniversary of the massacre, the first official 'Lod Massacre Remembrance Day' in Puerto Rico. The purpose of Lod Massacre Remembrance Day is to commemorate those events, to remember and honor both those murdered and those who survived, and to educate the Puerto Rican public against terrorism.

North Korea trial
In 2008, the eight surviving children of Carmelo Calderón Molina, who was killed in the attack, and Pablo Tirado, the son of Pablo Tirado Ayala, who was wounded, filed a lawsuit in the United States District Court for the District of Puerto Rico. They sued the government of North Korea for providing material support to the PFLP-EO and the JRA and for planning the attack. The plaintiffs claimed a right to sue the North Korean government based on the Foreign Sovereign Immunities Act of 1976. Preliminary hearings to examine evidence began on 2 December 2009, with district judge Francisco Besosa presiding. The North Korean government did not respond to the lawsuit and had no representatives present. The victims' families were represented by attorneys from the Shurat HaDin Israel Law Center, including its founder, Nitsana Darshan-Leitner.

In July 2010, the U.S. court ordered North Korea to pay US$378 million to families as compensation for the terror attack.

References

External links
1972: Japanese kill 26 at Tel Aviv airport (BBC News, On This Day, 29 May 1972).
Complaint and court documents from survivors' lawsuit against North Korea for supporting the JRA and PFLP

1972 in Japan
1972 mass shootings in Asia
1970s in Tel Aviv
1972 murders in Israel
1972 in aviation
Massacres in 1972
May 1972 events in Asia
Attacks on buildings and structures in Israel
Deaths by firearm in Israel
Mass murder in 1972
Mass shootings in Israel
Massacres in Israel
Massacres in Israel during the Israeli–Palestinian conflict
Massacres committed by the Palestine Liberation Organization
Palestinian terrorism
Terrorist attacks on airports
Terrorism committed by North Korea
Terrorist incidents in Asia in 1972
Terrorist incidents in Israel in the 1970s
Terrorist incidents in Tel Aviv
Japanese Red Army
Popular Front for the Liberation of Palestine attacks
Israel–Japan relations
Israel–North Korea relations
Israel–United States relations
Japan–North Korea relations
Japan–United States relations
North Korea–United States relations
Foreign relations of Puerto Rico